Jean Frédéric Joliot-Curie (19 March 1900 – 14 August 1958) was a French physicist and husband of Irène Joliot-Curie, with whom he was jointly awarded the Nobel Prize in Chemistry in 1935 for their discovery of Induced radioactivity. They were the second ever married couple, after his wife's parents, to win the Nobel Prize, adding to the Curie family legacy of five Nobel Prizes. Joliot-Curie and his wife also founded the Orsay Faculty of Sciences, part of the Paris-Saclay University.

Biography

Early years 
Born in Paris, France, Frédéric Joliot was a graduate of ESPCI Paris. In 1925 he became an assistant to Marie Curie, at the Radium Institute. He fell in love with her daughter Irène Curie, and soon after their marriage in 1926 they both changed their surnames to Joliot-Curie. At the insistence of Marie, Joliot-Curie obtained a second baccalauréat, a bachelor's degree, and a doctorate in science, doing his thesis on the electrochemistry of radio-elements.

Career 
While a lecturer at the Paris Faculty of Science, he collaborated with his wife on research on the structure of the atom, in particular on the projection, or recoil, of nuclei that had been struck by other particles, which was an essential step in the discovery of the neutron by James Chadwick in 1932. In 1935 they were awarded the Nobel Prize in Chemistry for their discovery of Induced radioactivity, resulting from the creation of short-lived radioisotopes by nuclear transmutation from the bombardment of stable nuclides such as boron, magnesium, and aluminium with alpha particles.

In 1937 he left the Radium Institute to become a professor at the Collège de France. In January 1939 he wrote a letter to his Soviet colleague Abram Ioffe, alerting him to the fact that German physicists had recently discovered nuclear fission of uranium bombarded by neutrons, releasing large amounts of energy. He went on to work on nuclear chain reactions and the requirements for the successful construction of a nuclear reactor that uses controlled nuclear fission to generate energy. Joliot-Curie was mentioned in Albert Einstein's 1939 letter to President Roosevelt as one of the leading scientists on the course to nuclear chain reactions. The Second World War, however, largely stalled Joliot's research, as did his subsequent post-war administrative duties.

At the time of the Nazi invasion in 1940, Joliot-Curie managed to smuggle his working documents and materials to England with Hans von Halban, Moshe Feldenkrais and Lew Kowarski. During the French occupation he took an active part in the French Resistance. In June 1941 he took part in the founding of the  National Front, and became its president. In the spring of 1942, he joined the French Communist Party to become a member of its Central Committee in 1956. Collins and LaPierre in their book Is Paris Burning? note that during the Paris uprising in August 1944 he served in the Prefecture of Police, manufacturing Molotov cocktails for his fellow insurgents, the Resistance's principal weapon against German tanks. The Prefecture was the scene of some of the most intense fighting during the uprising.

A team of scientists and intelligence officers from the allied Alsos Mission later found Curie at the Collège de France.  He was sent to England to be interviewed and gave important information about the names and activities of German scientists.

Post-war 
He served as director of the French National Centre for Scientific Research, and appointed by Charles De Gaulle in 1945, he became France's first High Commissioner for Atomic Energy. In 1948 he oversaw the construction of the first French atomic reactor. He and Irène visited Moscow for the two hundred and twentieth anniversary of the Russian Academy of Science and returned sympathizing with "hard-working Russians". His affiliation with the Communist party caused Irène to be detained on Ellis Island during her third trip to the US, coming to speak in support of Spanish refugees, at the Joint Antifascist Refugee Committee's invitation. A devoted communist, he was purged in 1950 and relieved of most of his duties, but retained his professorship at the Collège de France. Joliot-Curie was one of the eleven signatories to the Russell–Einstein Manifesto in 1955. On the death of his wife in 1956, he took over her position as Chair of Nuclear Physics at the Sorbonne. Frédéric's health was by that time declining, and he died in 1958 from liver disease, which, like the death of his wife, was said to be the result of overexposure to radiation.

Honours and awards 
Joliot-Curie was a member of the French Academy of Sciences and of the Academy of Medicine and named a Commander of the Legion of Honour.

He was elected a Foreign Member of England's Royal Society (ForMemRS) and a foreign member of the Royal Netherlands Academy of Arts and Sciences in 1946.

Joliot-Curie appeared as himself in Kampen om tungtvannet (La bataille de l'eau lourde in French; 1948), a French–Norwegian semi-documentary film about sabotage of the Vemork heavy water plant in Norway during World War II. His assistants Hans Halban and Lev Kovarski also appear. Joliot-Curie is shown lecturing about nuclear fission and chain reaction at the Collège de France.

He was the recipient of the first (1950) Stalin Peace Prize, awarded on 6 April 1951 for his work as president of the World Council of Peace, which he carried out from 1950 until his death in 1958.

A street in Sofia, Bulgaria, and the nearby Joliot-Curie Metro Station are named after Frédéric Joliot-Curie. Other streets bearing his name can be found in the Rivière-des-Prairies borough of north Montreal, Canada; in Bucharest, Târgu-Mureș, and Cluj-Napoca, Romania; in Warsaw and Wrocław, Poland; and in Poprad, Slovakia; in Gera, Germany.

The crater Joliot on the Moon is named after him.

Personal life 

Frédéric and Irène hyphenated their surnames to Joliot-Curie after they married on 4 October 1926 in Paris, France, although their daughter has said, "Many people used to name my parents Joliot-Curie, but they signed their scientific papers Irène Curie and Frédéric Joliot."

Joliot-Curie's daughter, Hélène Langevin-Joliot, was born in 1927. She is a nuclear physicist and professor at the University of Paris. Her brother, Pierre Joliot, was born in 1932. He is a biochemist at the Centre National de la Recherche Scientifique.

Frédéric Joliot-Curie devoted the last years of his life to the creation of the Orsay Faculty of Sciences and a centre for nuclear physics at Orsay, now part of Paris-Saclay University, where his children were educated.

See also
 Radioactive (film)

References

External links 

 
  including the Nobel Lecture, December 12, 1935 Chemical Evidence of the Transmutation of Elements
 Atomic Archive Biography
 Conference (Dec. 1935) for the Nobel prize of F. & I. Joliot-Curie, online and analyzed on BibNum [click 'à télécharger' for English version].
 
 
 

1900 births
1958 deaths
20th-century French physicists
Nobel laureates in Chemistry
French Nobel laureates
French activists
Members of the Front National (French Resistance) movement
Academic staff of the University of Paris
Academic staff of the Collège de France
Members of the French Academy of Sciences
Stalin Peace Prize recipients
ESPCI Paris alumni
Foreign Members of the Royal Society
Commandeurs of the Légion d'honneur
Recipients of the Order of the Cross of Grunwald, 3rd class
20th-century French chemists
Frederic
World Peace Council
Members of the German Academy of Sciences at Berlin
Members of the Royal Netherlands Academy of Arts and Sciences
French communists
Paris-Saclay University people
Presidents of the Société Française de Physique